Tuesday Lynn Knight (born Monday, February 17, 1969) is an American actress, singer and designer. She is best known for her role as Kristen Parker in the 1988 film A Nightmare on Elm Street 4: The Dream Master, replacing Patricia Arquette in the sequel to A Nightmare on Elm Street 3: Dream Warriors (1987). Her other film roles include Mistress (1992), The Fan (1996), Daddy and Them (2001), and How to Be Single (2016). Knight has had guest appearances on several television series, such as Profiler (1996) and The X-Files (1999), as well as a starring role on 2000 Malibu Road (1992). Outside of acting, her self-titled debut album was released in 1987 and her jewelry line was launched in 2001.

Never Sleep Again: The Elm Street Legacy
Knight, along with most of the Elm Street franchise alumni, is featured in a documentary, Never Sleep Again: The Elm Street Legacy, about New Line Cinema's hit movie series. The documentary is directed by Daniel Farrands and Andrew Kasch, produced by Thommy Hutson, and was hosted by Elm Street veteran Heather Langenkamp. The documentary wove the tale of how one of the most successful horror genre franchises came to be. It came out in May 2010.

Music
Tuesday has been on the music scene since 1985 with her debut album Little Things.  She later signed a recording deal with Vanity Records, which was one of the most sought-after labels at the time.  She released her album Don’t Talk Back in 1986. In 1986, she appeared on the original demo for the production that would become Jekyll & Hyde for Frank Wildhorn.

After working on the Quiet Riot album Metal Health as backing vocals, Knight was bought out of her contract by CBS/PARC Records where she then recorded what would be a self-titled album Tuesday Knight in 1987 on Parc/CBS Records. It contained a cover version of Prince's "Why You Wanna Treat Me So Bad?"  The album's sole single was called "Out of Control."  Her fourth album Here it Comes, released in 2000, had more of a commercial success than her previous attempt.

In 1990 she sang the song "Ivory Tower" on the Mad About You soundtrack.  In 1996, she sang a cover of The Police's song "Every Breath You Take" in an episode of Profiler entitled "I'll Be Watching You". In 2001, Tuesday provided her voice for the song "If It Takes All Night" in the film The Theory of the Leisure Class. She later watched a performance by the David Bowie Tribute Band Space Oddity and joined them as Keyboardist and Backing vocals. On September 17, 2012, Knight released Faith, an 18-track album featuring a collection of songs recorded over the past 25 years. In September 2017, Tuesday returned with a new album called Uncovered.

Her iconic cult classic song "Nightmare" is heard in the opening credits of 1988's A Nightmare on Elm Street 4: The Dream Master. The song was never released on the official soundtrack, but has since been released by Tuesday on CD and Mp3 formats.

Filmography

Film
{| class="wikitable"
|-
! Year !! Film !! Role !! Notes
|-
|1988
|Promised a Miracle 
|Roberta Palmer
|Television film
|-
|1988
|A Nightmare on Elm Street 4: The Dream Master 
|Kristen Parker
|
|-
|1989
|The Preppie Murder 
|Shawn Kovell 
|Television film
|-
|1990
|Teach 109 
|Technician 
|Television short
|-
|1992
|Who Killed Baby Jesus? 
|Eve Cody 
|
|-
|1992
|The Prom 
|Porn Girl in Waiting Room 
|
|-
|1992
|Mistress
|Peggy
| 
|-
|1993
|Calendar Girl 
|Nude Woman / Marilyn Monroe
|
|-
|1993
|Cover Story' 
|Tracy / Reen 
|
|-
|1994
|Wes Craven's New Nightmare 
|Herself
|
|-
|1994
|Cool and the Crazy 
|Brenda 
|Television film
|-
|1995
|The Babysitter 
|Waitress 
|
|-
|1995
|Star Witness 
|Anna
|Television film
|-
|1995
|Strike Back 
|Anna
|
|-
|1996
|The Fan 
|Nurse
|
|-
|1996
|The Hindsight 
|Karen 
|
|-
|1996
|The Cottonwood 
|Ruby 
|
|-
|1997
|Telling Lies in America 
|WHK Receptionist 
|
|-
|2000
|Brother 
|Prostitute
|
|-
|2001
|Theory of the Leisure Class 
|Callie 
|
|-
|2001
|Daddy and Them 
|Billy Montgomery 
|
|-
|2004
|Sweet Underground 
|Frances 
|
|-
|2005
|Diamond Zero a.k.a. IceMaker 
|Lil 
|
|-
|2010
|Never Sleep Again: The Elm Street Legacy|Herself
|Documentary
|-
|2013
|Opening Night 
|Victoria Lawson 
|
|-
|2016
|How to Be Single 
|Actress
|Uncredited
|-
|-
|2020
|The Bloody Man 
|Kim Harris
|
|-
|2021
|Sitting Duck|Camille Henderson
|
|-
|2021
|The Amityville Moon|Sister Ruth
|
|-
|}

Television

Discography
Studio albums
 Little Things (1985)
 Don't Talk Back (1986)
  Tuesday Knight (1987)
 Here It Comes (2000)
 Uncovered (2017)

Compilation albums
 Faith'' (2012)

References

External links
 
 

1961 births
Living people
American women singers
American film actresses
American soap opera actresses
American television actresses
Place of birth missing (living people)
People from Brentwood, California
20th-century American actresses
21st-century American actresses